Louis Armstrong (1901–1971), nicknamed Satchmo or Pops, was an American trumpeter, composer, singer and occasional actor who was one of the most influential figures in jazz and in all of American popular music. His career spanned five decades, from the 1920s to the 1960s, and different eras in jazz.

Coming to prominence in the 1920s as an "inventive" trumpet and cornet player, Armstrong was a foundational influence in jazz, shifting the focus of the music from collective improvisation to solo performance. With his instantly recognizable gravelly voice, Armstrong was also an influential singer, demonstrating great dexterity as an improviser, bending the lyrics and melody of a song for expressive purposes. He was also skilled at scat singing.

Renowned his charismatic stage presence and voice almost as much as for his trumpet-playing, Armstrong's influence extends well beyond jazz music, and by the end of his career in the 1960s, he was widely regarded as a profound influence on popular music in general. Armstrong was one of the first truly popular African-American entertainers to "cross over", whose skin color was secondary to his music in an America that was extremely racially divided. He rarely publicly politicized his race, often to the dismay of fellow African-Americans, but took a well-publicized stand for desegregation in the Little Rock Crisis. His artistry and personality allowed him socially acceptable access to the upper echelons of American society which were highly restricted for black men of his era.

Discography

Singles

Original albums

These LPs and EPs were released during Armstrong's lifetime and contained original studio and/or live recordings. The year and label information is for the first vinyl release, unless otherwise noted. Additional information such as number of tracks is given only when necessary to distinguish between different releases under the same title. In most cases, the number of CD releases listed is limited, with preference given to the label that originally released the album.

Posthumous releases

These LPs and CDs were released after Armstrong's 1971 death.
 Louis Armstrong in Prague Lucerna Hall 1965 (Panton, 1979) – reissued on CD in 2000 by Columbia
 Louis Armstrong's All Time Greatest Hits (MCA, 1994)
 16 Most Requested Songs (Columbia/Legacy, 1994)
 Louis Armstrong Hot Five and Hot Seven Sessions
 Hot Fives & Sevens (JSP, 1998)
 The Complete Hot Five & Hot Seven Recordings (Columbia/Legacy)
 Struttin' (Drive Archive, 1996) – 8 February 1947 concert with Edmond Hall's All-Stars
 The Complete Ella Fitzgerald & Louis Armstrong on Verve (1997) – repackaging of Ella and Louis, Ella and Louis Again, and Porgy and Bess
 rereleases of Together For The First Time and The Great Reunion
 The Great Summit: The Master Takes (2001)
 Louis Armstrong and Duke Ellington: The Great Summit/Complete Sessions (2000) – includes additional CD of alternate takes
 The Legendary Berlin Concert (Jazzpoint, 2000) – 22 March 1965 concert with Billy Kyle, Tyree Glenn, Eddie Shu, Arvell Shaw and Danny Barcelona
 The Katanga Concert (Milan, 2000) – previously unreleased November 1960 concert in Katanga, Africa with Trummy Young, Barney Bigard, Billy Kyle, Arvell Shaw, Danny Barcelona and Velma Middleton. Also contains 17 tracks that were previously issued on one of two earlier Milan CDs, Blueberry Hill (Recorded 17 May 1962 in Nice, France) and What a Wonderful World: The Elizabethtown Concert (Recorded November 1960 in Elisabethville, Africa)
 The Definitive Collection (Hip-O/Verve, 2006)
 Live in Amsterdam 1959 (Ais Records, 2011)
 The Complete Decca Studio Recordings of Louis Armstrong and the All-Stars (Mosaic Records, 1993)
The Complete Louis Armstrong Decca Sessions 1935–1946 (Mosaic Records, 2009)
The Columbia & RCA Victor Live Recordings of Louis Armstrong & The All-Stars (Mosaic Records, 2013)
The Complete Louis Armstrong Columbia & RCA Victor Studio Sessions 1946–66 (Mosaic Records, 2021)

List of songs recorded
Chronology of the recordings of Armstrong's songs:

References and sources

References

Sources
 Willems, Jos, All of Me : The Complete Discography of Louis Armstrong, Scarecrow Press, 2006, 

Discographies of American artists
Jazz discographies